Enterprise (20 December 1776 – February 1777), was the second American ship to bear the name.  She was a successful privateer before she was purchased for the Continental Navy in 1776.  Commanded by Captain James Campbell, the schooner Enterprise operated principally in Chesapeake Bay. She convoyed transports, carried out reconnaissance, and guarded the shores against foraging raids by the British. Only meager records of her service have been found; they indicate that she was apparently returned to the Maryland Council of Safety in 1777.

Only commissioned ships of the US Navy carry the USS (United States Ship).  The Navy also uses the prefix retroactively for ships that would have been commissioned under current practice.  Since the first  was still in service, this Enterprise would not have been commissioned by the US Navy and does not use the USS prefix.

See also
List of ships of the United States Navy named Enterprise

References

Sources

 Enterprise (II) at DANFS
 

Enterprise (1776)